Bobiatyn (also Bob'iatyn, Bobyatin, Bob'yatyn) – a small village (selo), which is located in Chervonohrad Raion, Lviv Oblast of Western Ukraine. It belongs to Sokal urban hromada, one of the hromadas of Ukraine. 

The population of the village is about 878 people, and the local government is administered by the Bobiatynska village council.

Geography

History and attractions
The first written mention of the village, that the owner of was Jacob from Bobiatyn village, dates back to 1448. Afterwards owners of the village had been Franciszek Salezy Potocki (1700-1772) and Stanisław Szczęsny Potocki (1751-1805).

Until 18 July 2020, Bobiatyn belonged to Sokal Raion. The raion was abolished in July 2020 as part of the administrative reform of Ukraine, which reduced the number of raions of Lviv Oblast to seven. The area of Sokal Raion was merged into Chervonohrad Raion.

In the village there are Greek Catholic Church of the Holy Trinity (of stone), what was built in 1902.

Notable people
 Kruchkevych Bogdan Volodimirovich (* 1923, Bobiatyn) – a member of the OUN.
 Mykytyuk Stepan Fedorovych (* 1922, Bobiatyn) – the conductor of the OUN.
 Stepan Khmara (* 1937, Bobiatyn) – Ukrainian politician, a longtime prisoner of the Gulag, the deputy of the Supreme Council of Ukraine of the I, II and IV term.

References

External links
 Bobiatynska village council
 Bobiatyn on the map of Ukraine
 weather.in.ua/Bob'iatyn

Literature
 Історія міст і сіл УРСР : Львівська область, Сокальський район, Боб'ятин. – К. : ГРУРЕ, 1968 р. Page 748 

Villages in Chervonohrad Raion